The Apertura 2015 Liga MX championship stage commonly known as liguilla (mini league) was played from November 25, 2015 to December 13, 2015. A total of eight teams competed in the championship stage to decide the champions of the Apertura 2015 Liga MX season. Both finalists qualified to the 2016–17 CONCACAF Champions League.

Qualified teams
The qualified teams were seeded 1–8 in the championship stage according to their results during the regular season.

Format
Teams are re-seeded each round.
Team with more goals on aggregate after two matches advances.
Away goals rule is applied in the quarterfinals and semifinals, but not the final.
In the quarterfinals and semifinals, if the two teams are tied on aggregate and away goals, the higher seeded team advances.
In the final, if the two teams are tied after both legs, the match goes to extra time and, if necessary, a shoot-out.
Both finalists qualify to the 2016–17 CONCACAF Champions League (in Pot 3).

Bracket

Quarterfinals

All times are UTC−6

First leg

Second leg

UANL won 3–1 on aggregate

América won 5–3 on aggregate

1–1 on aggregate, UNAM advanced for being the higher seed in the classification table

Toluca won 3–2 on aggregate

Semifinals

All times are UTC−6

First leg

Second leg

UNAM won 4–3 on aggregate

UANL won 2–0 on aggregate

Finals

All times are UTC−6

First leg

Second leg

4–4 on aggregate. UANL won 4–2 on penalty kicks

Goalscorers
4 goals
 André-Pierre Gignac (UANL)

2 goals
 Gerardo Alcoba (UNAM)
 Damián Álvarez (UANL)
 Javier Aquino (UANL)
 Darío Benedetto (América)
 Eduardo Herrera (UNAM)
 Darwin Quintero (América)
 Fernando Uribe (Toluca)

1 goal
 Paul Aguilar (América)
 Andrés Andrade (América)
 Omar Arellano (Toluca)
 Michael Arroyo (América)
 Matías Britos (UNAM)
 Hernán Burbano (León)
 Javier Cortés (UNAM)
 Paolo Goltz (América)
 Ignacio González (León)
 Elías Hernández (León)
 Robert Herrera (Puebla)
 Juan Manuel Insaurralde (Chiapas)
 Fidel Martínez (UNAM)
 Luis Gabriel Rey (Puebla)
 Rafael Sóbis (UANL)
 Ismael Sosa (UNAM)
 Silvio Torales (UNAM)
 Daniel Villalva (Veracruz)

References

External links
Liga MX website

 
1
Liga MX seasons